Ariada-NH was a professional ice hockey team based in Volzhsk, Mari El Republic, Russia. They played in the Central Division of the VHL. In 2017, they left the league due to financial difficulties and ultimately disbanded. From 2013 to 2016, team's name was Ariada Volzhsk.

Ice hockey teams in Russia
Sport in Mari El
1996 establishments in Russia
Ice hockey clubs established in 1996
Ice hockey clubs disestablished in 2017